Melchor Díaz (or Melchior) (died January, 1541) was an early Spanish explorer of western North America who "was a hard worker and skillful organizer and leader.  He inspired confidence in his companions and followers, and always maintained the best of order and of diligence among those who were under his charge".

1539 expedition
He was placed in charge of the town of San Miguel de Culiacán by Nuño de Guzmán.  When in 1539, Fray Marcos de Niza returned from Pimería Alta reporting he had seen the fabled cities of Cibola, Viceroy Antonio de Mendoza sent Diaz as the leader of a small expedition preliminarily to determine if reports by Fray Marcos were true. Information he gained was to benefit Coronado's planned and much larger expedition. He departed on November 17, 1539.

Coronado 1540 expedition
When Diaz failed to return at the expected time, Coronado embarked without him in February 1540. Diaz and Coronado met en route, and Diaz joined Coronado's group. Coronado then sent him on his second expedition to locate and investigate some villages reported in the area. He found the villages and reported they did not live up to the grand descriptions that had been given. Diaz was then sent ahead by Coronado to secure feed for the expedition's livestock.

In July, 1540, Diaz was sent to take the now-mistrusted and hated Fray Marcos back to Mexico and (say some reports) to take over leadership of the outpost at San Geronimo (or Hieronimo) in the valley of Corazones, now Ures, Sonora, and from there to attempt contact with the fleet of Hernando de Alarcón, which was to be the maritime arm of Coronado's expedition. In September, 1540, he began his third expedition, traveling overland to the head of the Gulf of California. Near the confluence of what is now the Colorado and Gila Rivers he learned from the natives that Alarcon had departed, but had left a cache of supplies and correspondence, which he located. The message basically stated that  Diaz crossed the Colorado River, becoming the first person of European background to do so, and named it Rio del Tizon ("River of Embers" or "Firebrand River") from the practice of the natives for keeping themselves warm. He was impressed with the physical strength of the natives of the area. He explored for four days west of the Colorado, perhaps as far as the Imperial Valley.

Death and legacy
While on this expedition (reports vary, some saying it ended further exploration, others saying it occurred while on the return) Diaz accidentally suffered a mortal wound. He threw a lance at a dog that was attacking their sheep. The lance stuck into the ground and before he could stop, Diaz impaled his groin on the back end of the lance. He lingered for twenty days, but died en route in January 1541.

Because of his untimely death, we do not have the kind of memoirs commonly written by other Spanish explorers. The reports that he made in the course of his expeditions, however, were quite detailed and contributed much to the knowledge of the area and the times for both contemporary and later readers. His name for the Colorado River was the accepted name for almost two centuries. He reported details of Native American culture. He discovered and reported geothermal hot springs, probably the ones near Calexico.

Notes

Further reading
 Pedro de Castañeda, translated with an extensive introduction by George Parker Winship, modern introduction, Donald C. Cutter, The Journey of Coronado, Fulcrum Publishing, 1990, hardcover, 233 pages, 

16th-century Spanish people
16th-century explorers
Spanish explorers of North America
1541 deaths
Explorers of the United States
Year of birth unknown